Emre Öztürk may refer to:

 Emre Öztürk (footballer, born 1986), Turkish-German footballer
 Emre Öztürk (footballer, born 1992), Turkish footballer